Sir Timothy David Melville-Ross,  (born 3 October 1944) is a British businessman who is chairman of the Higher Education Funding Council for England.

Melville-Ross was born in Westward Ho!, Devon, the son of Lt. Anthony Stuart Melville-Ross,  of the Royal Navy, and Anne Barclay Fane (née Gamble). He earned a diploma in business studies in 1967 from the Portsmouth College of Technology He was appointed a Commander of the Order of the British Empire in the 2005 New Year Honours for services to Workplace Learning and Development. He was a knighted in the 2018 New Year Honours for services to Higher Education.

References 

1944 births
Living people
British chief executives
Commanders of the Order of the British Empire
Knights Bachelor
Businesspeople from Devon
People from Torridge District